Sequoyah County may refer to more than one place in the United States:

 Sequoyah County, Oklahoma
 Finney County, Kansas was originally Sequoyah County, Kansas